Orectanthe is a genus of flowering plants, in the family Xyridaceae, first described as a genus in 1958. It is native to the tepui of northern South America (Venezuela, Guyana, and northwestern Brazil). It is closely related to Abolboda, and both known species were originally classified as members of Abolboda before being transferred to Orectanthe.

 Species
 Orectanthe ptaritepuiana (Steyerm.) Maguire - Venezuela, Guyana, northwestern Brazil
 Orectanthe sceptrum (Oliv.) Maguire - Venezuela, Guyana, northwestern Brazil

References

Xyridaceae
Poales genera
Flora of the Tepuis